Sütəmurdov (also, Sutamurdo and Sutamurdob) is a village and municipality in the Lankaran Rayon of Azerbaijan.  It has a population of 3,770.

References 

Populated places in Lankaran District